Eunice Jepkoech Sum (born 10 April 1988) is a Kenyan middle-distance runner who specializes in the 800 metres. She was the 2013 World champion and won the bronze medal in 2015. Sum took a silver and a gold at the 2012 and 2014 African Championships in Athletics respectively. She was also 2014 Commonwealth Games gold medallist and a three-time successive Diamond League winner in 2013–15.

Career
Sum was born in the village of Kesses in Uasin Gishu County in the former Rift Valley Province and competed in the heptathlon and handball at school. She gave birth to a daughter Diana Jeruto in 2008 and only began a full-time athletics career in 2009 after being spotted competing in a heptathlon event by former 800 metres world champion Janeth Jepkosgei. At her invitation, Sum moved to Eldoret to train with Jepkosgei's group.

She made her international championship début in the 800 metres at the 2010 African Championships in Athletics in Nairobi, but failed to make the final. In 2011, Sum set a personal best time of 1:59.66 in finishing second over 800 m at the Kenyan championships. This performance qualified Sum for the event at the 2011 World Championships in Athletics in Daegu, South Korea, where she reached the semi finals.

Sum won a silver medal – her first medal in international competition – in the 800 m at the 2012 African Championships in Athletics in Porto-Novo, Benin. She ran a personal best of 1:59.13 in the final, finishing two hundredths of a second behind Burundi's Francine Niyonsaba. Sum then competed in the 1500 m at the London Olympics, but finished a disappointing 10th in her heat and failed to qualify for the semi finals.

Sum progressed to the highest ranks of international competition in 2013, reaching her first global final and defeating Olympic champion and home favourite Mariya Savinova to win a surprise 800 m gold in a personal best time of 1:57.38 at the World Championships in Moscow. The Kenyan defeated Savinova again at the Weltklasse Zürich meeting to add the 2013 Diamond League crown in the 800 m to her world title.  She won the 800 m at the 2014 Commonwealth Games.

Personal life
Sum is the first cousin of Alfred Kirwa Yego, the 2007 world champion in the 800 metres. She is a fan of Chelsea FC.

Achievements

International competitions

Circuit wins and titles, National championships
 Diamond League 800 m overall winner (3):  2013,  2014,  2015
 800 metres wins, other events specified in parenthesis
 2013 (2): Stockholm DN Galan, Zürich Weltklasse
 2014 (4): Doha Qatar Athletic Super Grand Prix, Rome Golden Gala, Oslo Bislett Games, Lausanne Athletissima (SB)
 2015 (5): Shanghai Golden Grand Prix, Eugene Prefontaine Classic, Paris Meeting (WL), London Anniversary Games, Zürich
 Kenyan Athletics Championships
 800 metres (2): 2012, 2014

Personal bests
 800 metres  1:56.99 (Paris 2015)
 1500 metres  4:01.54 (Eugene 2014)
 3000 metres  8:53.12 (Eugene 2012)

References

External links

 

Kenyan female middle-distance runners
1988 births
Living people
Olympic athletes of Kenya
Athletes (track and field) at the 2012 Summer Olympics
Athletes (track and field) at the 2016 Summer Olympics
Athletes (track and field) at the 2014 Commonwealth Games
World Athletics Championships athletes for Kenya
World Athletics Championships medalists
Commonwealth Games gold medallists for Kenya
Commonwealth Games medallists in athletics
Diamond League winners
IAAF Continental Cup winners
World Athletics Championships winners
People from Uasin Gishu County
Athletes (track and field) at the 2020 Summer Olympics
Medallists at the 2014 Commonwealth Games